Qaravəlili is a village in the municipality of Püştətala in the Balakan Rayon of Azerbaijan. In the 2009 census its population was 2034.

References

Populated places in Balakan District